QuantiaMD is a defunct mobile and online community and collaboration platform for physicians which had over 200,000 registered members who spend an average of 19 minutes per session collaborating on the site. QuantiaMD helped validated clinician members to stay ahead by participating in short expert presentations, asking each other questions, and discussing how to use what they learn within their practice. QuantiaMD® is a registered trademark of Quantia Inc, a privately held corporation headquartered in Waltham, Massachusetts, USA.  It is part of Aptus Health, whose clients include pharmaceutical companies.  QuantiaMD is a marketing platform for the pharmaceutical industry.

Platform and content 
QuantiaMD’s website and mobile app featured short multimedia, interactive presentations on a variety of clinical and medical practice management topics.  Presentations and cases are offered by some 500 QuantiaMD expert faculty members, who include physicians from academic institutions, group practices, and community medical centers. Presentations feature Q&A with community response built in and are available on all smartphones, tablets and computers.

References

External links 
 quantiamd.com

Medical professional networks